Gary Rush may refer to:

Gary Rush, character in Silk (TV series)
Gary Rush, candidate in Electoral results for the Division of St George